Two royal yachts of the House of Romanov of the Russian Empire were named Livadia, after the Livadia Palace:

 , launched in 1873 and sunk in 1878
 , experimental ship launched in 1880 and retired in 1880

Ship names